Kurt D. Zwikl (June 28, 1949 – September 1, 2021) was a Democratic member of the Pennsylvania House of Representatives. He was first elected on November 15, 1973.

Zwikl died on September 1, 2021.

References 

1949 births
2021 deaths
Democratic Party members of the Pennsylvania House of Representatives
American people of German descent
Politicians from Allentown, Pennsylvania